Catabolite activator protein (CAP; also known as cAMP receptor protein, CRP) is a trans-acting transcriptional activator that exists as a homodimer in solution. Each subunit of CAP is composed of a ligand-binding domain at the N-terminus (CAPN, residues 1–138) and a DNA-binding domain at the C-terminus (DBD, residues 139–209). Two cAMP (cyclic AMP) molecules bind dimeric CAP with negative cooperativity. Cyclic AMP functions as an allosteric effector by increasing CAP's affinity for DNA. CAP binds a DNA region upstream from the DNA binding site of RNA Polymerase. CAP activates transcription through protein-protein interactions with the α-subunit of RNA Polymerase. This protein-protein interaction is responsible for (i) catalyzing the formation of the RNAP-promoter closed complex; and (ii) isomerization of the RNAP-promoter complex to the open conformation. CAP's interaction with RNA polymerase causes bending of the DNA near the transcription start site, thus effectively catalyzing the transcription initiation process. CAP's name is derived from its ability to affect transcription of genes involved in many catabolic pathways. For example, when the amount of glucose transported into the cell is low, a cascade of events results in the increase of cytosolic cAMP levels. This increase in cAMP levels is sensed by CAP, which goes on to activate the transcription of many other catabolic genes.

CAP has a characteristic helix-turn-helix motif structure that allows it to bind to successive major grooves on DNA. The two helices are reinforcing, each causing a 43° turn in the structure, with an overall  94° degree turn in the DNA.

This interaction opens up the DNA molecule, allowing RNA polymerase to bind and transcribe the genes involved in lactose catabolism. cAMP-CAP is required for transcription activation of the lac operon.

This requirement reflects the greater simplicity with which glucose may be metabolized in comparison to lactose. The cell "prefers" glucose, and, if it is available, the lac operon is not activated, even when lactose is present. This is an effective way of integrating the two different signals. This phenomenon is known as catabolite repression. CAP plays an important role in catabolite repression, a well-known example of a modulon and also plays a role in the Mal regulon.

References

External links
 

DNA